Gordon & Paddy is a 2017 Swedish animated comedy-drama film directed by Linda Hambäck. The film is an adaptation of the book written by Ulf Nilsson and illustrated by Gitte Spee. The film was selected to be screened in the Generation Kplus section at the 68th Berlin International Film Festival,. The film was released in Sweden the December 22nd in 2017 starring the voices of Stellan Skarsgård, Melinda Kinnaman and Felix Herngren for the Swedish version.

Plot
The forest's police chief Gordon is about to retire and he needs to find a new assistant. Paddy, a clever mouse with a great sense of smell seems to be the right candidate. Together they have to solve Gordon's last case – the mystery of squirrel's missing nuts. Could it be the fox that took them? Gordon and Paddy will soon find out.

Cast

References

External links
 
 
 

2017 animated films
2017 films
2017 comedy-drama films
Animated comedy films
Animated drama films
Swedish animated films
2010s children's animated films
Children's comedy-drama films
2010s Swedish films